Mohd Farhan Bin Abu Bakar (born 14 February 1993) is a Malaysian professional footballer who plays as a goalkeeper for Malaysia Super League club Kelantan.

International career
Farhan has represented Malaysia national team in 2013 Summer Universiade as a second choice goalkeeper after Izham Tarmizi. In an opening game against Italy, Farhan coming off the bench in the 72nd minute and gave a tremendous performance when he saved two penalty kicks in the 73rd and 78th minute. Malaysia won the game by 2–0.

Farhan played for Harimau Muda B in 2015 under head coach Razip Ismail.

Farhan earned his first senior national cap in a friendly match against Papua New Guinea on 17 June 2016, which Malaysia lost 0–2.

Career statistics

Club

Note
For 2013 season Farhan undergoes Centralized Training Camp in Slovakia and for 2014 he played at National Premier Leagues Queensland representing Harimau Muda A

International

Honours

Club
Kedah FA
Malaysia FA Cup: 2017
Malaysia Cup: 2016
Charity Shield: 2017

References

External links
 
 

1993 births
Living people
People from Kedah
Malaysian footballers
Malaysia international footballers
Association football goalkeepers
Footballers at the 2014 Asian Games
Malaysian people of Malay descent
Asian Games competitors for Malaysia
Sarawak United FC players
Kelantan F.C. players